The 1930 All-Ireland Senior Football Championship Final was the 43rd All-Ireland Final and the deciding match of the 1930 All-Ireland Senior Football Championship, an inter-county Gaelic football tournament for the top teams in Ireland.

Match

Summary
Monaghan scored first but Kerry won comprehensively with goals by John Joe Landers, John Joe Sheehy (captain of the team) and Ned Sweeney.

It was the first of five All-Ireland football titles won by Kerry in the 1930s.

This was also the first Championship meeting of Kerry and Monaghan. It remains Monaghan's only final appearance.

Monaghan's goalkeeper for this game, Thomas Bradley, was a First World War veteran who had been at the Battle of the Somme and Battle of Passchendaele.

Details

References

All-Ireland Senior Football Championship Final
All-Ireland Senior Football Championship Final, 1930
All-Ireland Senior Football Championship Finals
Kerry county football team matches
Monaghan county football team matches